"Redundant" is a song by American rock band Green Day. It was released as the third single from their fifth album, Nimrod (1997), and serves as the fourth track from that album. Released in April 1998, the song failed to match the chart positions of its predecessors but did reach number two in Australia when it was reissued as a double A-side with "Good Riddance (Time of Your Life)", becoming the band's highest-charting solo single there.

It is one of few Green Day songs in which vocalist/guitarist Billie Joe Armstrong uses an effects pedal.

Meaning
Before the Nimrod sessions, Billie Joe Armstrong's marriage had been deteriorating, with the singer arguing with his wife Adrienne Armstrong constantly. Influenced by this conflict, Armstrong reflected on the relationship from two standpoints; the first being his passion for his wife, the second being the repetitious pattern that the relationship had fallen into. The phrase "I love you" had lost its effectiveness and seemed to be said merely out of routine.

Music video
The music video for "Redundant", directed by Mark Kohr, is an homage to Zbigniew Rybczyński's short film Tango. It features the three band members performing the song in the middle of a home. The camera angle remains static for the duration of the video.

In the background, several people repeat various mundane tasks for the duration of the video:
 A newspaper is thrown from offscreen.
 A woman stretches her arms and yawns, and then collects the paper and leaves.
 Someone takes a painting off of a wall and replaces it with a new one; then someone else comes in and replaces that painting with the one that has just been replaced.
 An old lady walks in and tries to find her way out.
 A young girl walks from the left side of the screen, places a box on the coffee table next to the couch, and then climbs out of a window.
 A man in a green suit jacket walks around, picks up the box from the coffee table and leaves.
 A man in a cowboy hat walks around.
 A woman in a bright red dress (Dita Von Teese) removes her dress and then walks away in nothing but her bra and shorts.
 A balding man comes in, puts on a pair of trousers, then leaves.
 An obese man walks in from behind bringing a plant and putting it on a table by the wall. 
 A woman with a large pot picks up the plant and walks around.
 A man and a girl walk towards a couch and begin making out.
 A man is vacuuming.
 A young girl in a skirt comes in through a window, looks around, and leaves.

The activity peaks near the middle of the video and declines near the end. Tré and Mike leave, but Billie Joe removes his guitar, hands it offscreen, and picks up the newspaper before walking away. The woman comes out to get the paper and screams upon finding it gone.

Track listings

UK single 7-inch

Charts

Weekly charts

Year-end charts

Certifications

References

1997 songs
1998 singles
Green Day songs
Reprise Records singles
Songs written by Billie Joe Armstrong
American pop songs